Matúš Štoček (born 12 March 1999) is a Slovak racing cyclist, who currently rides for UCI Continental team .

Major results

2015
 2nd  Road race, European Youth Summer Olympic Festival
2016
 National Junior Road Championships
1st  Road race
1st  Time trial
 1st  Mountains classification, Trophée Centre Morbihan
 1st  Young rider classification, Tour du Pays de Vaud
 8th Overall Trofeo Karlsberg
1st Stage 3
2017
 National Junior Road Championships
1st  Road race
1st  Time trial
 5th Gent–Wevelgem Juniors
2018
 1st  Points race, National Track Championships
 National Under-23 Road Championships
1st  Road race
1st  Time trial
 National Road Championships
4th Road race
4th Time trial
2019
 National Under-23 Road Championships
4th Road race
4th Time trial
2021
 2nd Road race, National Road Championships
 9th Overall Tour du Pays de Montbéliard
1st  Points classification
 10th GP Slovakia
2022
 3rd Road race, National Road Championships
 3rd Overall Course de Solidarność et des Champions Olympiques
 3rd Memorial Philippe Van Coningsloo
 4th GP Slovakia
 8th Overall Gemenc Grand Prix

References

External links

1999 births
Living people
Slovak male cyclists
European Games competitors for Slovakia
Cyclists at the 2019 European Games